Warrumbungle National Park is a heritage listed national park located in the Orana region of New South Wales, Australia. The park attracts approximately  visitors per annum.

The national park is based on the geographical Warrumbungle Mountain Range, sometimes shortened to the Warrumbungles, and thus the park name is often heard in the plural. The park lies within the Pilliga Important Bird Area, so identified by BirdLife International because of its importance for a range of woodland bird species, many of which are threatened.

Warrumbungle National Park was added to the Australian National Heritage List in December 2006.

On 4 July 2016, the park was the first within Australia to be certified as a Dark Sky Park by the International Dark Sky Association.

Access
The nearest towns to the park are Baradine, Coonabarabran, Coonamble, Gilgandra, Gulargambone, and Tooraweenah.

The park is contained within three local government areas: Warrumbungle Shire to the east, Gilgandra Shire to the south and Coonamble Shire to the west.

Features

Located within the large area of temperate savanna grasslands the park incorporates the most spectacular part of the Warrumbungle mountains, a region of past volcanic activity with unusual lava formations. Some of the most well-known rock formations include Belougery Spire, Bluff Mountain, Mount Exmouth (tallest mountain in the park), The Breadknife, Split Rock, Fans Horizon and Crater Bluff.

There are many scenic bushwalks and both rock climbing and abseiling are popular. Though the park preserved habitat for koalas in the past, a massive 2013 fire decimated the koala population; none are thought to have survived.

Located immediately adjacent to the national park is the Siding Spring Observatory. The observatory, officially opened in 1965, was constructed on the boundary of the park partly because the park provided a light-free environment. This scientific facility consists of several internationally important telescopes and has considerable socio-economic importance to the local Coonabarabran community.

Facilities
There are four main campsites. All camping in the park is only permitted after obtaining a permit.  There is a visitors centre for bookings and keys to a number of huts.  The park also caters for large school groups.  There are free electric barbecues available however firewood is not supplied or to be collected within park grounds.

History
A proposal to reserve the more scenic parts of the Warrumbungle Range as the Warrumbungle National Monument was first initiated by the National Parks and Primitive Areas Council in 1936. The area was first proclaimed as a reserve in 1953. In 1967 management of the park was signed over to the National Parks and Wildlife Service. The construction of a network of walking tracks done by hand was headed by the parks first ranger, Carl Dow. The park was added to the list of the National Heritage in December 2006, in recognition of the park's importance as an extensive and spectacular geomorphological site with bold volcanic landforms that are unrivalled anywhere else in Australia; for its unique values as a transition zone between the arid western and wetter coastal zones; and its significance as an important refugium in inland south-east Australia.

2013 bushfire

In January 2013 about 80% of the national park was destroyed in a conflagration (thought to have been started by lightning) that burned much of the area surrounding the park as well as destroying dozens of homes. The visitor centre and museum were wiped out, as well as railings and viewing platforms throughout the park.  The park was closed after the fire, but has since reopened, although some parts remain closed.

In popular culture
The national park was used as a filming location for the video for singer David Bowie's 1983 single "Let's Dance", centering on The Breadknife.

The Japanese anime "Adventures of the Little Koala" takes place within the shadow of The Breadknife.

See also

 Protected areas of New South Wales

References

External links

Warrumbungle National Park: Park management at the NSW Office of Environment and Heritage.
NSW Parks and Wildlife Service Closure notice

National parks of New South Wales
Protected areas established in 1953
Australian National Heritage List
1953 establishments in Australia
Important Bird Areas of New South Wales